Nesovitrea is a genus of air-breathing land snails, terrestrial pulmonate gastropod mollusks in the family Oxychilidae, the glass snails.

Species
Species within the genus Nesovitrea include:
 Nesovitrea binneyana
 Nesovitrea dalliana
 Nesovitrea hammonis

Synonyms:
 Nesovitrea electrina (Gould, 1841), accepted as Perpolita electrina (Gould, 1841)

Distribution
This genus occurs in North America.

References

 Nomenclator Zoologicus info

Oxychilidae